Princess Zinaida Aleksandrovna Volkonskaya (Зинаида Александровна Волконская; 14 December 1792 – 24 January 1862), was a Russian writer, poet, singer, composer, salonist and lady in waiting. She was an important figure in 19th-century Russian cultural life. She performed in Paris and London as an amateur opera singer.

Biography 
She was born in Turin to the family of a Russian ambassador, Prince Alexander Beloselsky-Belozersky, and descended in the male line from the medieval rulers of White Lake City. Her mother was a Tatischev, also of Rurikid ancestry.

Zinaida was lady-in-waiting to Queen Louise of Prussia in 1808 and was close to Emperor Alexander I of Russia, who became her lifelong correspondent and, possibly, lover. To stem gossip, Zinaida married Alexander's aide-de-camp, Prince Nikita Volkonsky, in 1810. They were prominent during the Congresses of Vienna and Verona.

She moved to Russia in 1817, and to Moscow in 1822. In the 1820s the "Corinna of the North" hosted a literary and musical salon on Tverskaya Street in Moscow, in a mansion later rebuilt into the Yeliseyev food store. Adam Mickiewicz, Yevgeny Baratynsky, Dmitry Venevitinov, and Alexander Pushkin frequented her house. Pushkin's verse epistle to her, "The queen of music and beauty", is well known. 

After Alexander I's death her brother-in-law Sergey Volkonsky led the Decembrist Revolt against his successor Nicholas. The Decembrists were exiled to Siberia, and their wives decided to follow them. Zinaida threw a farewell party for these women, incurring the displeasure of Nicholas I. She also came under suspicion as a secret convert to Catholicism from Russian Orthodoxy and possible Jesuit agent.

These pressures led to Zinaida's moving to Rome in 1829. She was accompanied by her son and Stepan Shevyrev, the son's tutor. Among her lodgings in Rome were Palazzo Poli, Villa Wolkonsky, and a smaller house in the Via degli Avignonesi. Her salon was frequented by Karl Brullov, Alexander Ivanov, Bertel Thorvaldsen, Vincenzo Camuccini, Stendhal, and Sir Walter Scott. Nikolai Gogol wrote much of Dead Souls at her villa.

Princess Volkonskaya died of pneumonia (apparently after giving her warm cloak to an old street woman) and was buried at Santi Vincenzo e Anastasio a Trevi . An English-language biography by Maria Fairweather, Pilgrim Princess: A life of Princess Zinaida Volkonsky, made its appearance in 1998.

English translations
The Dream: A Letter, (story), from ''An Anthology of Russian Women's Writing, 1777–1992, Oxford, 1994.

References

External links
Aleksandrovna Volkonskaia papers at Houghton Library, Harvard University

1792 births
1862 deaths
Opera singers from the Russian Empire
Ladies-in-waiting from the Russian Empire
Salon holders from the Russian Empire
Zinaida
Converts to Roman Catholicism from Eastern Orthodoxy
Former Russian Orthodox Christians
Roman Catholics from the Russian Empire
Women writers from the Russian Empire
Poets from the Russian Empire
Deaths from pneumonia in Lazio
Expatriates from the Russian Empire in Italy
Composers from the Russian Empire
19th-century composers
Russian princesses
19th-century women composers